Monifa Carter (born January 28, 1972), also known as Monifah, is an American R&B singer. She is best known for her association with the late rapper Heavy D and her music from the mid-1990s, including "I Miss You (Come Back Home)", "You" and "Touch It", which was released in 1998. She starred on TV One's reality show R&B Divas: Atlanta.

Early life 
Monifah was born and raised in New York City.

Career 
In 1996, her gold certified debut album, Moods...Moments was released. In 1997, she contributed the Heavy D.-produced "I Still Love You" to the soundtrack of the film, Sprung. Monifah's second album was Mo'hogany. Released in the last quarter of 1998, it featured "Touch It". The track peaked at No. 29 in the UK Singles Chart. Monifah's third album Home, released in 2000 contained "I Can Tell", "Brown Eyes" and "Fairytales". In 2003, she played a supporting role in Michael Baisden's Men Cry in the Dark stage play. In August 2012, Monifah and R&B singers Syleena Johnson, Faith Evans , Keke Wyatt, LaTocha Scott, Angie Stone, and Nicci Gilbert appeared in a reality show for TV One called R&B Divas. It was later retitled R&B Divas: Atlanta and Monifah has appeared on the subsequent second and third seasons, with LaTavia Roberson and Kameelah Williams joining the cast in season 3 on April 23, 2014. In 2012, she appeared on Faith Evans' compilation album R&B Divas on the single "Lovin' Me" in addition to her solo track "She's Me". The album was later nominated for a Grammy. She released a new single "The Other Side" which premiered in June 2014. In 2015, Monifah signed with and released a single "One Moment" with Famous Records / Famous Music Group based out of Sunrise, Florida who distributes via Universal.

Personal life 
On R&B Divas: Atlanta, Monifah publicly revealed she is in a same-sex relationship. In the third-season finale of R&B Divas: Atlanta, she married her longtime partner Terez on April 4, 2014. Monifah has a daughter born in 1991.

Discography

Albums

Singles

References 

1972 births
African-American women singer-songwriters
American dance musicians
American soul singers
LGBT people from New York (state)
LGBT African Americans
American LGBT singers
American LGBT songwriters
Living people
American contemporary R&B singers
People from East Harlem
21st-century African-American women singers
20th-century African-American women singers
Singer-songwriters from New York (state)